Avery Marcel Joshua Jones (born October 16, 1992), known by his stage name Kota The Friend, is an American rapper, singer, songwriter, and record producer, born and raised in Brooklyn, New York. He got his stage name from the Disney movie Brother Bear and is actually a Native American word "Koda" meaning friend.

Kota the Friend released his debut mixtape, Palm Tree Liquor in 2016, followed by his second mixtape Paloma Beach in 2017. In 2018, he released his third mixtape, the lengthier Anything, with 2019 marking the release of his first independent studio album, FOTO, followed by the Lyrics to GO, Vol. 1 compilation in January 2020 and then his second studio album, EVERYTHING, in late May of the same year. Kota then went on to release Lyrics to GO, Vol.2 in January 2021 and the collaborative project To Kill A Sunrise with Statik Selektah later in March. Lyrics to GO, Vol.3 was surprise-released in January 2022, with Kota's third studio album, MEMO, following in July of that year.

Early life 
Avery Jones was born on October 16, 1992 in Brooklyn, New York City. Growing up as a Jehovah's Witness in Clinton Hill, Brooklyn, he developed an affinity for music, learning keyboard, guitar, and bass. He attended the Brooklyn High School of the Arts and Five Towns College for trumpet. During college, he created the rap trio Nappy Hair, releasing two mixtapes, "Autumn", and "Nappy Hair".

Career 
Kota the Friend has remained an independent act throughout his career—turning down 3 major record labels; instead, creating his own label and apparel store FLTBYS. He frequently cites a do-it-yourself mentality, such as filming his own music videos, recording within a home setup, and producing most of his discography. His mentality was fueled by a desire for freedom and to avoid the sense of musical confinement.

In his debut studio album FOTO, Kota featured appearances from artists Saba and Hello O'shay. Focusing on mellow and jazzy beats, it was praised by many for its quality and attention to detail. FOTO was ranked the 17th best hip-hop album of 2019 by Rolling Stone. He subsequently embarked on his first headlining tour, called the FOTO Tour.

His second studio album, EVERYTHING, featured appearances from notable artists such as Joey Badass, Bas, and KYLE, among others. In addition, he featured actress Lupita Nyong'o and actor Lakeith Stanfield in interludes. The album went on to peak at number 162 on the Billboard 200, becoming his first album to chart. The album received positive reception from fans, but was not picked up by any major review outlets at the time.

Kota's third studio album, MEMO, was released in July 2022 with only two features, the returning Hello O'shay and singer Brianna Castro.

Business Ventures 
Kota the Friend owns FLTBYS (pronounced Flight Boys), a skate, music and travel culture brand, which he started when he was a student in the 11th grade in Brooklyn, New York.

He purchased a building in Midtown Harrisburg, Pennsylvania in 2020, which houses his FLTBYS retail store on the ground floor.

Personal life 
In a Genius interview, Kota the Friend cited Jay-Z, Nasty C, Kid Cudi, Bob Dylan, The Beatles and others as musical influences.

Kota the Friend has one son.

Kota practices veganism periodically to cleanse himself and put himself in a better mindset.

Discography

Studio albums

Music in Film 
Kota the Friend's song titled Scapegoat, was used for the entire end credit in the Amazon Prime movie, Emergency (2022)

His song, Pomegranate was used in the Netflix movie, You People (2023), starring Eddie Murphy, Jonah Hill, Nia Long, Julia Louis-Dreyfus

External links 
FLTBYS

Kota the Friend

References 

1992 births
Living people
21st-century American rappers
African-American male rappers
People from Clinton Hill, Brooklyn
Rappers from Brooklyn
Singers from New York City
Songwriters from New York (state)
African-American songwriters
21st-century American male musicians
21st-century African-American musicians
American male songwriters